Lake Guthridge is a small artificial lake in Sale, Victoria, Australia, named after the first Sale mayor, Nehemiah Guthridge. The lake was originally a bog but Guthridge suggested converting it into a lake to supply the growing population. Its sister, Lake Guyatt acts as overflow.

Geological information

References

Guthridge
Sale, Victoria